This article contains information about the literary events and publications of 1770.

Events
February 6 – Voltaire writes to Abbot la Riche; the letter is said to be the source of his famous statement, "I disagree with what you say, but I will defend to the death your right to say it." ("Je ne suis pas d’accord avec ce que vous dites, mais je défendrai jusqu’à la mort votre droit de le dire.") This is now generally believed to be a misattribution.
December 
The Library of the Sorbonne in Paris is opened to the public.
After meeting Johann Wolfgang von Goethe in Strasbourg, Johann Gottfried Herder decides to enter the Berlin Academy annual essay competition.
unknown date – Göttinger Musenalmanach is launched by Johann Christian Dieterich.

New books

Prose
John Armstrong – Miscellanies
James Beattie – An Essay on the Nature and Immutability of Truth
Edmund Burke – Thoughts on the Cause of the Present Discontents
William Duff – Critical Observations on the Writings of the Most Celebrated Geniuses in Poetry
Philip Freneau and Hugh Henry Brackenridge – Father Bombo's Pilgrimage to Mecca (approximate year of composition, fully published 1975, a contender for first American novel)
Edward Gibbon – Critical Observations on the Sixth Book of the Aeneid
Oliver Goldsmith:
The Life of Thomas Parnell
Life of Henry St. John, Lord Viscount Bolingbroke
Ukawsaw Gronniosaw – A Narrative of the Most Remarkable Particulars in the Life of Ukawsaw Gronniosaw, an African Prince
Baron d'Holbach – The System of Nature
Samuel Johnson – The False Alarm
Immanuel Kant – Dissertation on the Form and Principles of the Sensible and the Intelligible World (De mundi sensibilis atque intelligibilis forma et principiis, inaugural dissertation)
Catharine Macaulay – Observations on a Pamphlet Entitled, Thoughts on the Present Discontents (in response to Burke)
Thomas Percy – Northern Antiquities
Raynal – A Philosophical and Political History of the Settlements and Trade of the Europeans in the East and West Indies
Catherine Talbot – Reflections on the Seven Days of the Week
John Horne Tooke – Genuine Copies of All the Letters ... Relative to the Execution of Doyle and Valine
Augustus Montague Toplady – A Letter to the Rev. Mr. John Wesley
Voltaire – Épître à l'Auteur du Livre des Trois Imposteurs
Arthur Young – A Six Months Tour Through the North of England

Drama

Pierre de Beaumarchais – Les Deux Amis
Isaac Bickerstaffe – The Recruiting Serjeant
Frances Brooke – Memoirs of the Marquis de St Forlaix
George Colman the Elder – Man and Wife
Johannes Ewald – Rolf Krage
Samuel Foote – The Lame Lover
Francis Gentleman – The Sultan
John Hoole – Timanthes
Hugh Kelly – A Word to the Wise
Louis-Sébastien Mercier – Le Déserteur (written)
George Alexander Stevens – The Court of Alexander
Ramón de la Cruz – El rastro por la mañana
Nicolás Fernandez de Moratín – Hormesinda

Poetry

Michael Bruce – Poems on Several Occasions
David Dalrymple – Ancient Scottish Poems
Oliver Goldsmith – The Deserted Village
William Woty – Works

Births
February 16 (bapt.) – Barbara Hofland, English children's and schoolbook author (died 1844)
March 20 – Friedrich Hölderlin, German poet (died 1843
April 7 – William Wordsworth, English Romantic poet (died 1850
October 2 – James Plumptre, English dramatist and cleric (died 1832)
December 9 (bapt.) – James Hogg, "the Ettrick shepherd", Scottish poet and novelist (died 1835)
Possible year – John Joseph Stockdale, English editor and publisher (died 1847)

Deaths
July 2 – James Parker, American printer and publisher (born 1714)
July 21 – Charlotta Frölich, Swedish poet and political writer (born 1698)
August 24 – Thomas Chatterton, English poet and forger (suicide, born 1752)
September 30 – George Whitefield, English-born evangelist (born 1714)
November 1 – Alexander Cruden, Scottish compiler of Bible concordance (born 1699)
November 24 – Charles-Jean-François Hénault, French historian (born 1685)
Approximate date – Alasdair mac Mhaighstir Alasdair, Scottish Gaelic poet (born c. 1698)

Awards
Prussian Royal Academy of Science: Johann Gottfried Herder, Treatise on the Origin of Language

References

 
Years of the 18th century in literature